Pearsoll Peak is a mountain in the Klamath Mountains of southwestern Oregon in the United States. It has a fire lookout on top that was spared in the Biscuit Fire of 2002.

References

External links 
 
 

Mountains of Oregon
Mountains of Curry County, Oregon
Landforms of Josephine County, Oregon